The Outstanding Artist Award for Music is given annually by the Federal Chancellery of Austria for achievements that influence the current art scene. Creative people are honored who can already show a meaningful oeuvre and whose works are of artistic supraregional importance. The prize is endowed with €10,000. The award winners are selected by an independent expert jury. The prize is awarded as a category of the Outstanding Artist Awards. In total, the Outstanding Artists Awards are given in 14 categories. The predecessor award State Prize for Music (Staatspreis für Musik) was given from 1950 to 1970. In 2009, the award was named Outstanding Artist Award for Music.

Recipients 
Source:

This award was given as the Austrian State Prize for Music from 1950 to 1970, then from 1971 to 2009 as "promotion award for music".

 1950 Armin Kaufmann
 1951 Theodor Berger
 1952 Hans Erich Apostel, Max Haager, Ernst Tittel, Karl Etti, Erich Romanovsky, Karl Schiske
 1953 Paul Angerer, Erwin Miggl, Walter Andress, Alfred Uhl
 1954 Anton Heiller, Leopold Matthias Walzel, Ernst L. Uray, Cesar Bresgen
 1955 Fritz Skorzeny
 1956 no award
 1957 Franz Hasenöhrl, Waldemar Bloch, Konrad Stekl
 1958 Walter Pach
 1959 Richard Winter, Marcel Rubin, Reinhold Schmid
 1960 no award
 1961 Thomas Christian David, Robert Schollum
 1962 Helmut Eder, Walther Nußgruber
 1963 Fritz Leitermayer, Jenő Takács
 1964 Paul Kont, Augustinus Franz Kropfreiter, Franz Burkhart
 1965 Fridolin Dallinger
 1966 Kurt Schmidek
 1967 Josef Friedrich Doppelbauer, Gerhard Wimberger
 1968 Cesar Bresgen
 1969 Augustin Kubizek
 1970 Karl Heinz Füssl, Iván Erőd, Irmfried Radauer
 1971 Friedrich Cerha
 1972 Horst Ebenhöh, Alfred Mitterhofer, Ferdinand Weiss
 1973 Josef Maria Horváth
 1974 Carl Colman
 1975 Heinz Karl Gruber, Erik Freitag
 1976 Richard Kittler, Michael Rot
 1977 Dieter Gaisbauer
 1978 Herbert Schwendinger
 1979 Andor Losonczy, Otto M. Zykan
 1980 Richard Heller
 1981 Werner Schulze
 1982 no award
 1983 Paul Engel
 1984 Gerhard Schedl
 1985 Gerhard E. Winkler
 1986 Meinhard Rüdenauer, Herbert Willi
 1987 Franz Koglmann, Wolfgang Mitterer
 1988 Haimo Wisser
 1989 Richard Dünser, Wilhelm Zobl
 1990 Gerhard Kühr, Herbert Lauermann, Franz Thürauer
 1991 Peter Planyavsky, Michael Radulescu
 1992 Maximilian Kreuz, Gerhard Präsent
 1993 Max Nagl, Wolfgang Reisinger
 1994 Josef Klammer
 1995 Georg Friedrich Haas, Thomas Larcher
 1996 Alfred Stingl, Alexander Wagendristel, Gunter Waldek
 1997 Kurt Estermann, Wolfgang Sauseng
 1998 Thomas Herwig Schuler, Wolfram Wagner
 1999 Burkhard Stangl
 2000 Erdem Tunakan, Patrick Pulsinger
 2001 Johannes Maria Staud
 2002 Gernot Schedelberger
 2003 Bernd Richard Deutsch, Thomas Daniel Schlee
 2004 Johannes Kretz, Helmut Schmidinger
 2005 Clementine Gasser
 2006 Markus Bless
 2007 Oguz Usman
 2008 Šimon Voseček
 2009 Roland Freisitzer
 2010 Thomas Wally
 2011 David Helbock
 2012 Susanne Kirchmayr
 2013 Alexandra Karastoyanova-Hermentin
 2014 Bernhard Lang
 2015 Pia Palme, Pier Damiano Peretti
 2016 Utku Asuroglu
 2017 Zahra Mani, Reinhold Schmölzer
 2018 Andrea Sodomka
 2019 PHACE – Ensemble for new music
 2020 Klaus Lang

References

Further reading
 

Austrian music awards
Awards established in 1950